Hungary competed at the 2015 World Aquatics Championships in Kazan, Russia between 24 July to 9 August 2015.

Medalists

Diving

Hungarian divers qualified for the individual spots and the synchronized teams at the World Championships.

Men

Women

Open water swimming

Hungary has fielded a team of six swimmers in the open water marathon.

Men

Women

Mixed

Swimming

Hungarian swimmers have achieved qualifying standards in the following events (up to a maximum of 2 swimmers in each event at the A-standard entry time, and 1 at the B-standard): Swimmers must qualify at the 2015 Hungarian Swimming Championships (for pool events) to confirm their places for the Worlds.

Men

Women

Mixed

Synchronized swimming

Hungary has qualified one synchronized swimmer for each of the following events at the World Championships.

Water polo

Men's tournament

Team roster

Viktor Nagy
Miklós Gór-Nagy
Norbert Madaras
Balázs Erdélyi
Márton Vámos
Norbert Hosnyánszky
Dániel Angyal
Márton Szívós
Dániel Varga
Dénes Varga
Krisztián Bedő
Balázs Hárai
Attila Decker

Group play

Quarterfinals

5th–8th place semifinals

Fifth place game

Women's tournament

Team roster

Flóra Bolonyai
Dóra Czigány
Dóra Antal
Dóra Kisteleki
Gabriella Szűcs
Orsolya Takács
Anna Illés
Rita Keszthelyi
Ildikó Tóth
Barbara Bujka
Krisztina Garda
Katalin Menczinger
Edina Gangl

Group play

Playoffs

9th–12th place semifinals

Ninth place game

References

External links
 

Nations at the 2015 World Aquatics Championships
2015 in Hungarian sport
Hungary at the World Aquatics Championships